Snowbird is an unincorporated community in Little Cottonwood Canyon in the Wasatch Range of the Rocky Mountains near Salt Lake City, Utah, United States. It is most famous for Snowbird Ski and Summer Resort, an alpine skiing and snowboarding area, which opened in December 1971.

History 

The development of Little Cottonwood Canyon and the town of Alta dates to the 19th Century. A U.S. Army soldier first prospected for silver there in 1869. Mining became a large local industry, and Little Cottonwood Canyon became one of the largest producers of silver ore in the Wasatch Mountains. Known as the Emma Mine (the origin of the name of the Big Emma ski run in Snowbird's Gad Valley), the soldier's find eventually produced more than $3.8 million in silver. At its peak, 8,000 people lived and worked in the narrow canyon, which held two smelters, 138 homes, hotels, boarding houses, stores and a railroad. The entire town was later destroyed by a series of avalanches.

The resort is a multi-facility winter and summer (primarily winter) resort. Primarily known for its winter powder skiing and snowboarding, during other seasons Snowbird also hosts hikers, mountain bikers, fishermen, and other mountain vacationers. The facilities include ski lifts, hotels, condominiums, spa facilities, restaurants, other resort-related retail businesses, and medical services.

The resort operates almost entirely on privately owned land, unlike the majority of Utah ski areas.

The originator of the Snowbird resort concept was Ted Johnson, who had managed the Alta Lodge in the town of Alta at the head of Little Cottonwood Canyon for about a decade. He had explored the terrain below Alta in the Peruvian Gulch and Emma Mine/Gad Valley watersheds that later became Snowbird.  Johnson met Dick Bass, a Texas oilman, in 1969, and the two of them partnered to create the Snowbird resort, which opened in 1971. In 1974, Johnson sold his interest in Snowbird to Bass.

On May 12, 2014, an ownership change was announced. Businessman Ian Cumming became the majority owner, in partnership with Bass, who remained chairman. Dick Bass died in 2015 and Ted Johnson died in 2018.

In July 2021 Snowbird shut down the Tram Club. The decision was kept private with no warning to the staff or public. It had been at Snowbird since 1994 and was a hot spot for locals in the community. The tram club was reopened in December of 2022.

Ski resort

Snowbird resort is a year-round ski and summer resort located in the heart of the Wasatch National Forest on the eastern border of the Salt Lake City suburb of Sandy. The resort first opened in December 1971.

Snowbird shares Little Cottonwood Canyon with Alta Ski Area to the east, just up the canyon over a ridge that separates the two. The collaboration coincided with the opening of a new lift in Mineral Basin, a large bowl owned by Snowbird on the back of Snowbird's Hidden Peak and Alta's Sugarloaf mountains that had been skiable within the resort since 1999. The installation of Baldy Express in 2002 allowed access to Alta from the Basin. Other access points between the two resorts exist as well. The offer is open to skiers only, as a result of Alta's skiers-only (no snowboarders) policy.

In contrast to the humid and wet conditions in the Cascades near the Pacific Ocean, the arid condition of the Great Basin produces very dry and powdery snow, making Snowbird and Alta top global destinations for powder-skiing aficionados. Another benefit of being East of the Great Salt Lake is that salt from the lake provides the condensation nuclei that creates ice pellet snow that doesn't pack like normal snowflakes. Loose powder for days after a snowfall is common. On very windy days the salt is lifted thousands of feet and has been known to coat the windshield of airplanes flying into Salt Lake City.

Snowbird, which operates primarily on privately owned land, usually closes on Memorial Day in late May while the occasional ski year can last as long as the Fourth of July on the upper part of the mountain (accessed by the aerial tram), perennially offering the longest ski season in Utah as other Utah resorts must close earlier because they are on Forest Service land. Hidden Peak is serviced by an aerial tram from the base area.

The resort covers three drainage areas: Peruvian Gulch, Gad Valley, and Mineral Basin. Snowbird is perennially celebrated by industry magazines for its exceptional snowfall, vast and wide-ranging terrain and easy accessibility from the Salt Lake City International Airport.

Snowbird is known for its particularly challenging terrain, with most ski runs having a difficulty of "intermediates only" or higher. The most difficult part of the mountain is the cirque traverse, which contains all runs for experts only.

Lifts 

Snowbird currently has 10 chairlifts (6 high-speed quads, 4 doubles), a surface lift, an aerial tram, and a  tunnel enclosing a one-way conveyor lift connecting Peruvian Gulch to Mineral Basin allowing easier access for beginners and intermediates to new terrain.  The tunnel, the only of its kind in North America, also allows for skier transport when winds require the closing of the aerial tram. The tunnel connects the front half of the resort to Mineral Basin, which is the back half of the mountain. Inside of the tunnel, there is also pictures with descriptions about the history of the tunnel's construction.

Facilities

The Little Cottonwood Canyon resort has a total of four lodges: the Iron , the Inn, the Lodge at Snowbird, and the Cliff Lodge. The resort also has gift shops, restaurants, arcades, hiking trails, pools and a rooftop spa. The summit restaurant was built at Hidden Peak during summer 2015.

The resort has  of meeting space, with 31 meeting rooms and a  Event Center available in the summer.

Summer Activities
While being widely known as a ski resort, Snowbird is also open during the summer. Throughout the warmer months, Snowbird offers a wide variety of activities that allow visitors to enjoy all the features, without the snow. There are many different activities that travelers can participate in during the summer, but there are five that most people tend to gravitate towards: The Alpine Slide, The Mountain Coaster, Summer Tubing, The Vertical Drop, and Ropes Courses.

The Alpine Slide is a dual track that runs down the Chickadee ski slope and includes twists, turns, and tunnels. The driver must be at least seven years old, but three to six-year-olds can ride on an adult's lap (18+). The Mountain Coaster is a 3,120 feet coaster that fits up to two riders. It sits near the base of the Peruvian Express chairlift outside the Snowbird Center. Riders must be at least three years old, and in order to ride alone they must be 54 inches tall. Participants between 38 and 54 inches can ride with an adult (16+). Summer Tubing is the warm weather version of snow tubing and is available to the east of Chickadee by the entrance of The Cliff Lodge. Participants must be at least four years old and 40 inches tall. The Vertical Drop is a 50-foot tower located near the top of Chickadee. Participants experience what is known as the “Big Drop”, which includes nine feet of free-falling that is followed by a gradual fall to the ground. To partake, visitors must weigh between 44 and 285 pounds. The Ropes Course, located near the Chickadee bowl, allows travelers to be strapped into a harness and walk high above ground to see all of Snowbird's beauty. Participants must be at least 48 inches tall, weigh under 300 pounds, and have on closed toed shoes. For children ages two to six that do not meet those requirements, there is also The Mini Ropes Course. The kids must be under 130 pounds and have on closed toed shoes, but this alternative is parent guided and includes all the same challenges without the height factor.

Awards
Skiing Magazine ranked the Alta-Snowbird ski area second in North America overall and first in the United States for the 2003–04 and 2004–05 seasons.
According to SKI Magazine (October 2002) Snowbird ranked 20th in North America with gold medals in snow, access, challenge, terrain, scenery, weather, and lifts. In specific categories it was ranked third in North America for snow, fourth in North America for challenge, and fifth in North America for terrain.  Snowbird ranks as the second best resort in North America, runner-up to Whistler Blackcomb resort in Canada, according to Skiing Magazine. In 2008, Outside named Alta-Snowbird the number one ski destination in North America. More recently, ZRankings ranked Snowbird as the fourth best ski resort in North America. Snowbird's snowfall and weather is also considered to be amongst the best in the world for skiing; ZRankings rated Snowbird's snow as the second best in North America (behind its next-door neighbor, Alta).
Two of Snowbird's mountain school instructors, Rob Sogard and Nancy Thoreson, made SKI Magazine'''s Top 100 list.

Images

References

 Shelton, Peter (1989) Insiders Guide to the Best Skiing in Utah Telluride: Western Eye Press 
 Asmus, Brad (1993) Powder Hound's Guide to Skiing Snowbird''

External links 

Snowbird Ski & Summer Resort's official Web site
Live Webcams

Sports venues in Salt Lake County, Utah
Salt Lake City metropolitan area
Ski areas and resorts in Utah
Utah culture
Resorts in the United States
Populated places established in 1971
Unincorporated communities in Salt Lake County, Utah
Unincorporated communities in Utah
Articles containing video clips
1971 establishments in Utah